Copelatus zimmermanni is a species of diving beetle. It is part of the subfamily Copelatinae in the family Dytiscidae. It was described by Gschwendtner in 1934.

References

zimmermanni
Beetles described in 1934